Sicydium plumieri (Spanish vernacular: Olivo, Ceti; English vernacular: Sirajo Goby) is a freshwater species of the goby native to the Antilles from Cuba to Trinidad and Tobago, though not recorded from all islands.  This species can reach a length of  TL. It is also known by the English common names sirajo, Plumier's stone-biting goby, and tri-tri goby. The young, which are regarded as a delicacy, are of commercial importance. The specific name honours Charles Plumier (1646-1704), a Franciscan friar and naturalist, who found the first specimens of the species on Martinique and Marcus Elieser Bloch based his species description on Plumier's drawings.

References

Taxa named by Marcus Elieser Bloch
Fish described in 1786
Vertebrates of Puerto Rico
plumieri